Piotr Dłucik (born 20 April 1954) is a Polish former backstroke swimmer. He competed in two events at the 1972 Summer Olympics.

References

External links
 

1954 births
Living people
Polish male backstroke swimmers
Olympic swimmers of Poland
Swimmers at the 1972 Summer Olympics
Sportspeople from Katowice
20th-century Polish people